Douglas Scott "Dusty" Dvorak (born July 29, 1958 in San Diego, California) is a former volleyball player from the United States, who was a member of the American Men's National Team that won the gold medal at the 1984 Summer Olympics. Dvorak was inducted into the Volleyball Hall of Fame in 1998.

References

External links
Profile

1958 births
Living people
American men's volleyball players
Volleyball players at the 1984 Summer Olympics
Olympic gold medalists for the United States in volleyball
Volleyball players from San Diego
University of Southern California alumni
Place of birth missing (living people)
USC Trojans men's volleyball players
Medalists at the 1984 Summer Olympics
American people of Czech descent
Goodwill Games medalists in volleyball
Competitors at the 1986 Goodwill Games
Setters (volleyball)